Robert Scott (20 May 1930 – February 2015) was a Scottish footballer, who played as a right winger in the Football League.

References

External links

1930 births
2015 deaths
Scottish footballers
Footballers from Bellshill
Association football wingers
Dunfermline Athletic F.C. players
Alloa Athletic F.C. players
Accrington Stanley F.C. (1891) players
Wrexham A.F.C. players
Oldham Athletic A.F.C. players
Nelson F.C. players
Bacup Borough F.C. players
English Football League players